The Lioness was a steamboat that exploded on the Red River of the South on the morning of May 19, 1833.

Departing from New Orleans, the ship made its way up the Mississippi River before reaching the Red River, destined for Natchitoches, Louisiana. As it neared the mouth of a tributary called Rigolet de Bon Dieu (near modern-day Colfax), three explosions rocked the ship, tearing apart the fore deck and boiler deck and scattering debris across the surrounding waters and coast. The hull almost immediately sunk; however, the hurricane deck and a portion of the lady's cabin became detached from the rest of the ship, staying afloat and saving everyone in those quarters. All of those who survived saved themselves by swimming or floating to shore on fragments of the wreck.

The explosions were believed to be caused by a spark from a candle igniting several kegs of gunpowder while several crew members were arranging cargo in the hold of the ship. This would explain why there were three explosions, each occurring when another keg detonated. Crates of dry straw and casks of oil stowed dangerously close to the gunpowder kegs also accelerated the fire. There is not, however, an official explanation on how the powder was ignited, as everyone in the hold was killed.

At least 16 people were killed in the disaster, including United States Senator Josiah S. Johnston. Among the survivors were Congressman and future Louisiana Governor Edward Douglass White, Sr., who suffered some burns and bruises, and District Judge Henry Boyce.

References
"Regolet Bon-Dieu, LA Steamer LIONESS Explosion, May 1833" Sandusky Clarion 1833-06-26
"Natchitoches, LA Area Steamboat 'Lioness' Explosion & Fire, May 1833" Lloyd's Steamboat Disasters, pages 83-87

1833 in the United States
Industrial fires and explosions in the United States
Maritime incidents in May 1833
Paddle steamers
Passenger ships of the United States
Ship fires
Shipwrecks of the Red River of the South
Steamships
Transportation disasters in Louisiana
May 1833 events